The 2009 Boston mayoral election occurred on Tuesday, November 3, 2009, between incumbent Mayor of Boston Thomas Menino, and Michael F. Flaherty, member of the Boston City Council and former Council president.  Menino was re-elected to a fifth term, the first mayor to do so in Boston history. A nonpartisan municipal preliminary election was held on September 22, 2009, where Flaherty and Menino advanced to the general election.

31% of registered voters turned out to vote in the election.

Campaign
After the preliminary election, Flaherty and fellow-Councillor Sam Yoon, who had finished third, declared they had formed a ticket. If Flaherty  were victorious, he vowed to appoint Yoon deputy mayor, a position that had not existed in Boston since the administration of Kevin White, who left office in 1984. Details of the position, including salary, were never finalized.

Candidates

Candidates who advanced to general election

Candidates eliminated in the primary

Primary election

Endorsements

Results

General election

Campaign
Following the preliminary election, Flaherty immediately began an aggressive campaign, attacking Menino as ineffectual. Sam Yoon and Michael Flaherty announced that they would run as a ticket in the general election, with Flaherty pledging to appoint Yoon deputy mayor if he won. Kevin McRea also announced that he would endorse Flaherty.

Endorsements
Names in bold endorsed after the preliminary election.

Results

See also
List of mayors of Boston, Massachusetts
2009 Boston city council election

References

Further reading

Candidates' websites
Flaherty for Mayor
McCrea for Mayor
Menino for Mayor
Yoon for Mayor

External links
City's website
Boston Mayor Race - Nov 03, 2009 at ourcampaigns.com

Mayoral election
Boston mayoral
Boston
Mayoral elections in Boston
Non-partisan elections
Boston mayoral election